Hans Millonig (born 11 May 1952) is an Austrian former ski jumper.

World Cup

Standings

Wins

External links

1952 births
Living people
Sportspeople from Villach
Ski jumpers at the 1980 Winter Olympics
Austrian male ski jumpers